The 30th Brigade was a formation of the British Army during the First World War. It was assigned to the 10th (Irish) Division and served at Gallipoli in the Middle East and Salonika.

Formation
 6th Battalion, Royal Munster Fusiliers (August 1914 – April 1918, reduced to cadre and transferred to 39th Division)
 7th Battalion, Royal Munster Fusiliers (August 1914 – November 1916, absorbed by 6th Battalion)
 6th Battalion, Royal Dublin Fusiliers (August 1914 – May 1918, transferred to 66th Division)
 7th Battalion, Royal Dublin Fusiliers (August 1914 – April 1918, reduced to cadre and transferred to 16th Division)
 1st Battalion, Royal Irish Regiment (November 1916 – October 1918)
 38th Dogras (April – October 1918)
 46th Punjabis (May – October 1918)
 1st Battalion, Kashmir Rifles (April – October 1918)

References

Infantry brigades of the British Army in World War I